Mackinnon Road Airport is an airport in Mackinnon Road, Kenya.

Location
Mackinnon Road Airport  is located in Taita-Taveta County, in the town of Mackinnon Road, in southeastern Kenya, close to the International border with the Republic of Tanzania and to the eastern coast of Kenya, on the shores of the Indian Ocean. The airport lies just below the southern tip of Tsavo East National Park.

The geographic coordinates of this airport are:3° 44' 0.00"S, 39° 2' 42.00"E (Latitude:-3.733334; Longitude:39.045000).

Overview
Mackinnon Road Airport is a small airport that serves the town of Mackinnon Road and the adjacent Tsavo National Park.

Airlines and destinations
At the moment there are no regular, scheduled airline services to Mackinnon Road Airport.

See also
 Tsavo National Park
 Kenya Civil Aviation Authority
 List of airports in Kenya

References

External links
 Location of Mackinnon Road Airport At Google Maps
  Website of Kenya Airports Authority
  Airkenya Flight Routes
 

Airports in Kenya
Coast Province
Taita-Taveta County
Tsavo National Park